Edward Dillon ( or 1879 – July 11, 1933) was an American actor, director and screenwriter of the silent era. He performed in more than 320 films between 1905 and 1932 and also directed 134 productions between 1913 and 1926. He was a native of New York City.

Dillon's work on Broadway included acting in Prince Otto (1900), Francesca da Rimini (1901), The Taming of the Shrew (1905), and The Ranger (1907). He left the stage to begin acting in films in 1908, working under D. W. Griffith at Biograph. He was Mary Pickford's first leading man, and he was instrumental in Fay Tincher's developing into a star.

Dillon died on July 11, 1933, at the age of 60 in Hollywood, California from a heart attack. His brother John T. Dillon was also an actor.

Selected filmography

Actor

 Bobby's Kodak (1908, Short) - Father
 When Knights Were Bold (1908) *short
 The Fight for Freedom (1908, Short) - Man in Bar / Member of the Posse
 The Kentuckian (1908, Short) - Ward Fatherly
 Monday Morning in a Coney Island Police Court (1908, Short)
 Where the Breakers Roar (1908, Short) - Policeman
 After Many Years (1908, Short)
 The Feud and the Turkey (1908, Short)
 The Reckoning (1908, Short)
 The Welcome Burglar (1909, Short)
 The Brahma Diamond (1909, Short)
 In the Border States (1910, Short) - Confederate Soldier (uncredited)
 A Flash of Light (1910, Short) - At First Party
 The Modern Prodigal (1910, Short) - Guard
 The Lucky Toothache (1910, Short) - One of the Boys
 The Fugitive (1910, Short) - John - the Confederate Son
 A Mohawk's Way (1910, Short) - Friend
 What Shall We Do with Our Old? (1911, Short) - In Shop
 Fisher Folks (1911, Short) - At Fair
 The Lonedale Operator (1911, Short) - The Telegrapher
 Priscilla's April Fool Joke (1911, Short) - Paul
 Priscilla and the Umbrella (1911, Short) - Harry
 Enoch Arden (1911, Short) - Rescuer
 A Country Cupid (1911, Short) - Among Students
 The Miser's Heart (1911, Short) - Down-and-Out Young Man
 The Old Bookkeeper (1912, Short) - The Old Bookkeeper's Employer's Friend - the Office Visitor
 For His Son (1912, Short) - At Soda Fountain (uncredited)
 The Root of Evil (1912, Short) - The Wealthy Man's Secretary - the Daughter's Husband
 A Voice from the Deep (1912, Short) - Percy
 Help! Help! (1912, Short) - Office Worker
 Won by a Fish (1912, Short) - Harry
 The Spirit Awakened (1912, Short) - The Christian Farmhand
 Blind Love (1912, Short) - The Young Man
 His Auto's Maiden Trip (1912, Short) - Mr. Jinx
 The Informer (1912, Short) - Confederate Soldier
 Love in an Apartment Hotel (1913, Short) - Pinky Doolan - a Bellboy
 Broken Ways (1913, Short) - Minor Role (uncredited)
 The Little Tease (1913, Short) - In Lunchroom
 Red Hicks Defies the World (1913, Short) - O'Shea, the Fighting Irishman
 Almost a Wild Man (1913, Short) - Rooly, Pooly, Dooly
 The Mothering Heart (1913, Short) - Club Patron (uncredited)
 An Indian's Loyalty (1913, Short) - The Young Foreman
 Judith of Bethulia (1914) - Minor Role (uncredited)
 Home, Sweet Home (1914) - The Musician
 Nell's Eugenic Wedding (1914, Short)
 Fatty and the Heiress (1914, Short)
 Fatty and Minnie He-Haw (1914, Short)
 Shotguns That Kick (1914, Short)
 Fatty's Wine Party (1914, Short)
 Fatty's Jonah Day (1914, Short)
 An Incompetent Hero (1914, Short)
 Lovers' Post Office (1914, Short)
 Don Quixote (1915)
 Mr. Goode, Samaritan (1916) - Shifty Ed
 Intolerance (1916) - Crook
 The Lady Drummer (1916)
 America (1924) - Minor Role (uncredited)
 The Skyrocket (1926)
 Lilac Time (1928) - Corporal 'Smithie'
 The Broadway Melody (1929) - Dillon - Stage Manager (uncredited)
 The Locked Door (1929) - Minor Role (uncredited)
 Hot for Paris (1929) - Ship's Cook
 Caught Short (1930) - Mr. Thutt
 Reducing (1931) - Train passenger (uncredited)
 Iron Man (1931) - Jeff
 Sob Sister (1931) - Pat
 The Trial of Vivienne Ware (1932) - Mr. Hardy (uncredited)
 While Paris Sleeps (1932) - Concierge's Husband
 Week Ends Only (1932) - Guest - Sitting / Standing Gag (uncredited)
 The Golden West (1932) - Pat (uncredited)
 Sherlock Holmes (1932) - Al (uncredited)

Director

 With the Aid of Phrenology (1913)
 Those Happy Days (1914)
 The Sky Pirate (1914)
 The Alarm (1914)
 Nell's Eugenic Wedding (1914)
 Sunshine Dad (1916)
 A Daughter of the Poor (1917)
 The Antics of Ann (1917)
 Might and the Man (1917)
 The Embarrassment of Riches (1918)
 The Frisky Mrs. Johnson (1920)
 A Heart to Let (1921)
 Women Men Marry (1922)
 Broadway Gold (1923)
 The Speeding Venus (1926)
 Bred in Old Kentucky (1926)
 The Danger Girl (1926)

Radio 
The Edwin/Dillon Show (January 15, 1928-July 13, 1928) (Distributed by KSTP St. Paul and The Film Booking Offices of America)

References

External links 

 
 

1870s births
1933 deaths
20th-century American male actors
American male film actors
American male silent film actors
American film directors
American male screenwriters
Male actors from New York City
Screenwriters from New York (state)
20th-century American male writers
20th-century American screenwriters
American male stage actors
Broadway theatre people